On the Air is a 1934 British musical film directed by Herbert Smith and starring Davy Burnaby, Reginald Purdell and Betty Astell. It was made by British Lion at Beaconsfield Studios. It was one of a number of revue films made by the company during the decade.

The film's art direction was by Norman G. Arnold.

Cast
 Davy Burnaby as Davy  
 Reginald Purdell as Reggie  
 Betty Astell as Betty  
 Anona Winn as Chambermaid  
 Max Wall as Boots  
 Hugh E. Wright as Vicar  
 Derek Oldham as Derek Oldham  
 Jane Carr as Jane Carr  
 Eve Becke as Eve Becke 
 Edwin Styles as Edwin Styles  
 Mario de Pietro as Mario de Pietro  
 Teddy Brown as Teddy Brown  
 Harry Champion as Harry Champion  
 Roy Fox as Roy Fox  
 Jimmy Jade as Jimmy Jade 
 Clapham and Dwyer as Themselves
 Scott and Whaley as Themselves 
 Wilson, Keppel and Betty as Themselves
 The Buddy Bradley Rhythm Girls as Themselves

References

Bibliography
 Low, Rachael. Filmmaking in 1930s Britain. George Allen & Unwin, 1985.

External links

1934 films
British musical films
1934 musical films
Films shot at Beaconsfield Studios
Films set in England
Films directed by Herbert Smith
British black-and-white films
1930s English-language films
1930s British films